Montagnac or Montanhac may refer to the following places in France:

Montagnac, Alpes-de-Haute-Provence, a former commune in the Alpes-de-Haute-Provence département that is now a part of Montagnac-Montpezat
Montagnac, Gard, in the Gard département
Montagnac, Gers, a former commune in the Gers département that is now in the commune of Catonvielle
Montagnac, Hérault, in the Hérault département
Montagnac-d'Auberoche, in the Dordogne département 
Montagnac-la-Crempse, in the Dordogne département
Montagnac-Montpezat, in the Alpes-de-Haute-Provence département 
Montagnac-sur-Auvignon, in the Lot-et-Garonne département
Montagnac-sur-Lède, in the Lot-et-Garonne département

Montagnac, Algeria, colonial name for Remchi, a town and commune in Tlemcen Province, Algeria